Fagraea is a genus of plants in the family Gentianaceae. It includes trees, shrubs, lianas, and epiphytes. They can be found in forests, swamps, and other habitat in Asia, Australia, and the Pacific Islands, with the center of diversity in Malesia.

Many Fagraea species have a variety of human uses, particularly the wood and flowers. The flowers open in the evening and are often fragrant and bat-pollinated. They are so conspicuous they have roles in Polynesian mythology. They make the trees attractive as ornamental plantings. Some are used in leis. Fagraea auriculata produces a flower over 30 centimeters wide, one of the largest flowers of any plant in the world. Many species, especially the Malesian taxa, have valuable wood. It was used to carve tikis. Some have been used in traditional medicine, perfumery, and aromatherapy. The flowers are featured in the traditional artwork of various cultures.

The fruits are food for many animals, including cassowaries, flying foxes, and civets.

Species
, Plants of the World Online records 59 accepted species:

Fagraea acutibracteata 
Fagraea annulata 
Fagraea auriculata 
Fagraea berteroana 
Fagraea blumei 
Fagraea bodenii 
Fagraea borneensis 
Fagraea cameronensis 
Fagraea carnosa 
Fagraea carstensensis 
Fagraea ceilanica 
Fagraea coromandelina 
Fagraea crassifolia 
Fagraea curtisii 
Fagraea dulitensis 
Fagraea epiphytica 
Fagraea euneura 
Fagraea eymae 
Fagraea fastigiata 
Fagraea floribunda 
Fagraea fraserensis 
Fagraea gardeniiflora 
Fagraea gardenioides 
Fagraea gitingensis 
Fagraea graciliflora 
Fagraea gracilipes 
Fagraea havilandii 
Fagraea iliasii 
Fagraea imperialis 
Fagraea involucrata 
Fagraea kalimantanensis 
Fagraea kinabaluensis 
Fagraea kinghamii 
Fagraea kuminii 
Fagraea larutensis 
Fagraea latibracteata 
Fagraea litoralis 
Fagraea longiflora 
Fagraea longipetiolata 
Fagraea macroscypha 
Fagraea megalantha 
Fagraea oblonga 
Fagraea oreophila 
Fagraea plumeriiflora 
Fagraea pyriformis 
Fagraea rarissima 
Fagraea renae 
Fagraea resinosa 
Fagraea ridleyi 
Fagraea salticola 
Fagraea splendens 
Fagraea stonei 
Fagraea tacapala 
Fagraea ternatana 
Fagraea truncata 
Fagraea tubulosa 
Fagraea tuyukii 
Fagraea umbelliflora 
Fagraea woodiana

Note
The formerly accepted taxon Fagraea fragrans   is now considered to be a synonym of Cyrtophyllum fragrans

Gallery

References

 
Gentianaceae genera
Taxonomy articles created by Polbot